Davide Tizzano (born 21 May 1968 in Naples) is a retired rower from Italy and a double Olympic gold medalist. He won his first gold medal at the 1988 Summer Olympics in Seoul, in the quadruple scull. Eight years later he formed a team with Agostino Abbagnale, with whom he triumphed in the men's double scull event.

References

RAI Profile

External links 
 
 
 
 

1968 births
Living people
Italian male rowers
Rowers at the 1988 Summer Olympics
Rowers at the 1996 Summer Olympics
Olympic rowers of Italy
Olympic gold medalists for Italy
Rowers from Naples
Olympic medalists in rowing
Medalists at the 1996 Summer Olympics
Medalists at the 1988 Summer Olympics
World Rowing Championships medalists for Italy